was a railway station in Asahikawa, Hokkaidō, Japan, operated by Hokkaido Railway Company (JR Hokkaido).

Lines
Inō Station is served by the Hakodate Main Line, and is numbered A26.

Adjacent stations

Reference

External links

Railway stations in Hokkaido Prefecture
Railway stations in Japan opened in 1898
Railway stations closed in 2021